Charles Chapman (26 August 1860 – 23 August 1901) was an English cricketer. He played five first-class matches for Cambridge University Cricket Club between 1882 and 1883.

See also
 List of Cambridge University Cricket Club players

References

External links
 

1860 births
1901 deaths
English cricketers
Cambridge University cricketers
Berkshire cricketers